Hrvatska Lutrija is the national lottery of Croatia.

History 
In 1951, was established as the Directorate for Croatia, which was a part of the Yugoslav Lottery.

In 1973, it became an independent organization for the Croatian lottery, although remained part of the Business community of Yugoslav lotteries.

In 1993, two years after Croatia became an independent country, the lottery was renamed to Hrvatska Lutrija d.o.o.

References

External links 
 

Lotteries
1973 establishments in Croatia
Government-owned companies of Croatia
Companies based in Zagreb